The name Benke (meaning "Little Ben") originates from a form of Benedek (Hungarian form of Benedict). Benke immigrants in North America came predominantly from Ireland, Germany and England.

People
 David Benke, American Lutheran pastor
 Judit Benke de Laborfalva, known as: Róza Laborfalvi (1817–1886), Hungarian actress
 Mike Benke
 Valéria Benke (1920–2009), Hungarian politician

See also 
 Behnke
 Behncke
 Benkei

References 

Low German surnames